Gabriel Claudio (born October 25, 1999) is an American soccer player who plays as a defender for One Knoxville in USL League One.

Career

Youth, College & Amateur
Claudio attended Cibola High School, where he helped the team finish third in the state tournament during his junior season. Claudio was a two-time first team all-state selection and claimed conference Player of the Year honors in 2017. He also spent two seasons on the football team, playing kicker, free safety and wide receiver, earning City Player of the Year recognition and first team all-state honors as a junior in 2017 after setting every major receiving and touchdown record in Yuma County history. He was also a first-team all-state selection on defense as a sophomore.

In 2017, Claudio attended Yavapai College to play college soccer. In two seasons with the Roughriders, Claudio made 38 appearances, scoring 12 goals and tallying six assists. Claduio helped Yavapai to a conference title in 2019 while earning Region Player of the Year Runner-Up honors, and was a first team All-NJCAA All-Region team selection. 

2020 saw Claudio transfer to the University of Nevada, Las Vegas. Here he made 29 appearances, scoring two goals, adding three assists, and was an Honorable Mention for the All-WAC teams. 

While at college, Claudio was with FC Golden State Force of the USL League Two during their 2019 season, but didn't make an appearance for the team. In 2021, he played with NPSL club Laredo Heat, scoring two goals in nine games, and was also named as a finalist for the NPSL Conference XI awards.

Professional
On March 22, 2022, Claudio signed with USL League One club Union Omaha. He debuted for the club on April 9, 2022 appearing as an 85th–minute substitute during a 2–2 draw with Forward Madison.

Claudio signed with League One expansion club One Knoxville on January 26, 2023.

References

External links
 Profile at UNLV Athletics

1999 births
Living people
American soccer players
Association football defenders
FC Golden State Force players
Laredo Heat players
National Premier Soccer League players
People from Yuma, Arizona
Soccer players from Arizona
Union Omaha players
UNLV Rebels men's soccer players
USL League One players
Yavapai Roughriders men's soccer players